The rocky shiner (Notropis suttkusi) is a species of ray-finned fish in the genus Notropis. It is endemic to the United States where the species is known from tributaries of the Red River draining the Ouachita Mountains in southeastern Oklahoma and southwestern Arkansas, including several localities in the Kiamichi, Little and Muddy Boggy rivers.  Its range extends west to the Blue River in Oklahoma, and east to the Cossatot River in Arkansas.

References 

 Robert Jay Goldstein, Rodney W. Harper, Richard Edwards: American Aquarium Fishes. Texas A&M University Press 2000, p. 111
 

Notropis
Fish described in 1994
Taxa named by Julian M. Humphries
Taxa named by Robert Cashner